Book of the Light is a 1998 role-playing game supplement for The Everlasting published by Visionary Entertainment Studio.

Contents
Book of the Light is a sourcebook presenting creatures from both sides of the divine struggle in the setting.

Reception
The reviewer from the online second volume of Pyramid stated that "Now, this feels like a good roleplaying book. The bright, glossy color cover features an evocative bit of artwork that nevertheless isn't inappropriate for, say, a coffee table. The book has a nice heft to it, and is liberally sprinkled with illustrations. In fact, the artwork drew me towards this. With a wonderful mix of styles, ranging from European woodcuts to incredibly twisted modern horror pen and ink, it's a pretty book."

Reviews
The Unspeakable Oath #16/17 (2001 Digest)

See also
 The Everlasting - The Book of the Unliving (1997)

References

Role-playing game books
Role-playing game supplements introduced in 1998